Wish You Well may refer to:

 "Wish You Well" (Bernard Fanning song) (2005)
 "Wish You Well" (Sigala and Becky Hill song) (2019)
 "Wish You Well", a 2013 song by Lydia from the album Devil
 Wish You Well (film), a 2013 theatrical family film directed by Darnell Martin
 Wish You Well (novel), a novel by David Baldacci